Palandöken Dam is a rock-fill embankment dam on the Lezgi River  near Çat in Erzurum Province, Turkey. Constructed between 1985 and 1988, the development was backed by the Turkish State Hydraulic Works.

See also
List of dams and reservoirs in Turkey

References

Dams in Erzurum Province
Rock-filled dams
Dams completed in 2001
2001 establishments in Turkey